Rosslyn Football Club was a 19th-century association football club based in Glasgow.

History
The club claimed a foundation date of 1871, but there are no matches recorded for it from before 1876, and no records of the club in the early years of the Scottish Football Association.

Rosslyn entered the Scottish Cup on three occasions.  In 1877–78, the club beat Shaftesbury of Hillhead 3–1 away from home, and lost to Caledonian of Glasgow 1–0 in the second. 

The following season, the club lost 1–0 at home to Union of Crosshill.  

The club's final entry, in 1879–80, saw the club get a walkover in the first round, as scheduled opponents Blackfriars had seemingly disbanded.  In the second round the club lost 3–1 at Ailsa.

The final game recorded for the club was a 1–0 win at the 2nd XI of Carrick at the end of the 1880–81 season.

Colours

The club's colours were navy blue shirts and white shorts, except for 1878–79 when they were all white.

Ground

The club's original ground was in Overnewton.  In September 1877, the club moved to a new ground, at Brighton Park in Govan.  However by December the club had a new ground in Partick.  From 1878 the club was playing at Merkland Park.

References

Defunct football clubs in Scotland
Football clubs in Glasgow
Association football clubs established in 1876
Association football clubs disestablished in 1881
1876 establishments in Scotland
1881 disestablishments in Scotland